A kangaroo is a large marsupial endemic to Australia.

Kangaroo may also refer to:

Aircraft and aerospace 
 Blackburn Kangaroo, a British World War I heavy bomber
 Kangaroo Route, a term for commercial flights between Europe and Australasia via the Eastern Hemisphere
 PWN-9 Kangaroo, a 1969 American sounding rocket project
 Sol Kangaroo, a Brazilian paraglider design
 The Kangaroo, a Cessna Model AW with a Warner-Scarab engine owned by Eddie August Henry Schneider

Fiction and fictional characters 
 Kangaroo (novel), a story by D.H.Lawrence
 Kangaroo (comics), an enemy of Spider-Man in comics

Film 
 Kangaroo (1952 film), an American film directed by Lewis Milestone
 Kangaroo (1987 film), an Australian film based on the 1923 D.H. Lawrence novel Kangaroo
 Kangaroo (2007 film), a Malayalam film directed by Raj Babu starring Prithviraj Sukumaran
 Kangaroo (2015 film)
 Kangaroo (2017 film), an Australian film directed by Mike McIntyre and Kate McIntyre Clere
 The Kangaroo Kid (film), a 1950 Australian-American western film directed by Lesley Selander
 The Kangaroo, a short film produced by Vickie Gest

Geography

Generally
 Kangaroo Island (disambiguation)
 Kangaroo Point (disambiguation)
 Kangaroo River (disambiguation)

Australia
 East Kangaroo Island, an island in Tasmania
 Kangaroo Island, an  island in South Australia
Kangaroo Head, a headland
Kangaroo Head, South Australia, a locality

Elsewhere
 Kangaroo Lake (California), a lake in California, United States
 Kangaroo Lake (Wisconsin), a lake in Wisconsin, United States
 Kangaru, Iran, a village
 Kangaru, Kenya, a village

Military vehicles 
 Kangaroo (armoured personnel carrier), an expedient conversion of a tank into an armoured personnel carrier during World War II by British Commonwealth forces
 Raduga Kh-20 (NATO designation AS-3 Kangaroo), a cruise missile armed with a nuclear warhead which was developed by the Soviet Union during the Cold War

Music 
Kangaroo?, a 1981 album by Red Krayola and Art & Language
 The Kangaroo (song), a 1953 instrumental written and recorded by Les Paul and released as a single
 "Kangaroo" (or "Kanga Roo"), a song by Big Star from the album Third/Sister Lovers, notably covered by This Mortal Coil and Jeff Buckley
 "Kangaroo", a single by Arab on Radar
 "Kangaroo", a single by Julian Jordan and Sander van Doorn
 Kangaroo, a precursor to the American band Holy Moses

Ships 
 , a Royal Australian Navy boom defence vessel in commission from 1940 to 1955
 , the name of several British Royal Navy ships
 , a United States Coast Guard patrol boat, renamed USCGC AB-6 in 1923, in commission from 1919 to 1932
 , the name of more than one United States Navy ship

Sports 
 KangaRoos, an American brand of athletic shoe
 UMKC Kangaroos, the athletics team of University of Missouri–Kansas City
 Kangaroo Hoppet, an Australian cross-country skiing race
 The Fabulous Kangaroos, an Australian professional wrestling team
 The Royal Kangaroos, a professional wrestling tag team
 Kangaroos, the nickname of the Australia national rugby league team
 Kangaroos, the nickname of the North Melbourne Football Club of the Australian Football League
 The mascot of Lake Washington High School in Kirkland, WA

Other uses 
 The Kangaroo Defence, a chess opening also known as the Keres Defence
 Kangaroo care, a way of holding a prematurely-born infant with skin-to-skin contact
 Kangaroo meat, the meat of any of the species of kangaroo
 Kangaroo rat, a small rodent in western United States
 Kangaroo unicycle, a type of unicycle that has both the cranks facing in the same direction
 Kangaroo, a procedure of the Parliament of the United Kingdom
 Kangaroo word, a word that contains letters of another word, in order, with the same meaning
 Kangaroo court, a sham legal proceeding
 Kangaroo (novel), a 1923 novel by D. H. Lawrence
 Mathematical Kangaroo, or International Mathematical Kangaroo, an annual international children's mathematics competition
 Gold kangaroo, a term for the Australian gold bullion coin minted by the Perth Mint
 Kangaroo (video game), a 1982 video game based on the marsupial
 Kangaroo (Bus ticketing scheme), a  bus ticketing scheme operated in Nottingham, UK
 Kangaroo Express, a chain of convenience stores in the US
 Kangaroo (video on demand), a proposed video on demand platform
 Kangourou wagon, a specialized railroad car

See also
 The Kangaroo (disambiguation)
 The Kangaroos (disambiguation)